Power is a 1986 American political drama film directed by Sidney Lumet and starring Richard Gere. The original screenplay by David Himmelstein focuses on political corruption and how power affects both those who wield it and the people they try to control.

Denzel Washington's performance in the film as public relations expert Arnold Billings earned him the 1987 NAACP Image Award for Outstanding Supporting Actor in a Motion Picture. Beatrice Straight's performance as Claire Hastings earned her a Golden Raspberry Award nomination for Worst Supporting Actress.

Plot
Pete St. John (Richard Gere), a ruthless and highly successful media consultant, is juggling a couple of political candidates when he is asked to join the campaign of wealthy but little-known businessman Jerome Cade (J. T. Walsh), who hopes to win the Senate seat being vacated by St. John's friend Sam Hastings (E.G. Marshall).

St. John comes into conflict with Arnold Billings (Denzel Washington), a public relations expert whose firm Cade has hired. St. John's investigation into Cade's background prompts Billings to retaliate by bugging St. John's office phones, flooding the basement of his headquarters, tampering with his private jet, and interfering with his other clients.

These actions force St. John to examine himself and what he has become and to decide whether his ex-wife Ellen Freeman (Julie Christie) and his former partner Wilfred Buckley (Gene Hackman) are right in believing that his success is due primarily to the exploitation of others.

Cast
 Richard Gere as Pete St. John 
 Julie Christie as Ellen Freeman 
 Gene Hackman as Wilfred Buckley 
 Kate Capshaw as Sydney Betterman 
 Denzel Washington as Arnold Billings 
 E. G. Marshall as Senator Sam Hastings 
 Beatrice Straight as Claire Hastings 
 Fritz Weaver as Wallace Furman
 Kevin Hagen as Cop
 Michael Learned as Governor Andrea Stannard 
 J. T. Walsh as Jerome Cade 
 Matt Salinger as Phillip Aarons

Critical reception
Vincent Canby of The New York Times, described the film as "a well-meaning, witless, insufferably smug movie that...suffers from the total lack of a comic imagination."

Roger Ebert of Chicago Sun-Times,  gave it a positive but qualified review and wrote, "Because these relationships are so well-written and acted, and because Power seems based on a wealth of research about the world of campaign professionals, the movie builds up considerable momentum during its first hour. There's a sense of excitement, of identification with this man who is being driven by his own energy, ambition and cynicism . . . During the second half of the movie, however, a growing disappointment sets in. Power is too episodic. It doesn't really declare itself to be about any particular story, any single clear-cut issue . . . The climax is a pointless, frustrating montage of images. It's a good montage, but it belongs somewhere in the middle of the movie; it states the problem, but not the solution or even the lack of a solution. The movie seems to be asking us to walk out of the theater shaking our heads in disillusionment, but I was more puzzled than disillusioned . . . It's smart, it's knowledgeable, sometimes it's funny, occasionally it is very touching, and I learned something from it. That is almost enough, I suppose; it's more than most movies provide."

On Rotten Tomatoes, it has 50% score based on 12 reviews. On Metacritic it has a 50% score, indicating "mixed or average reviews".

See also
 List of American films of 1986

References

External links
 

1986 films
1986 drama films
American drama films
Films about advertising
20th Century Fox films
Films directed by Sidney Lumet
Films about elections
Films set in 1986
Films set in Cleveland
Films set in New Mexico
Films set in New York City
Films set in Ohio
Films set in Seattle
Films set in Washington, D.C.
Films set in South America
Films scored by Cy Coleman
1980s English-language films
1980s American films